Nancy Frangione (born July 10, 1953 in Barnstable, Massachusetts) is an American soap opera actress. She is a graduate of Barnstable High School.

Career
Frangione debuted on soap operas in 1977, playing the role of Tara Martin on All My Children; Frangione departed that role in 1979.

She is best known for her role as the scheming villainess Cecile DePoulignac on Another World, which she played from June 1981 to November 1984 winning the 1st Soap Opera Digest Awards as Outstanding Villainess in 1984. She reprised the role four times, in 1986, 1989, 1993, and from October 1995 to June 1996.
 
In addition to other soap operas, such as One Life to Live, where she filled in for an ailing Andrea Evans as Tina Lord in 1985, Frangione has appeared on nighttime television series such as The Nanny (as Fran's cousin Marsha), Highway to Heaven, Matlock, and Buck Rogers in the 25th Century.

Personal life
Frangione was married to her Another World co-star Christopher Rich from 1982 to 1996; they had one daughter named Mariel Rich.

References

External links
 

Actresses from Massachusetts
American soap opera actresses
American television actresses
People from Barnstable, Massachusetts
1953 births
Living people
Barnstable High School alumni
21st-century American women